Propebela harpularia is a species of sea snail, a marine gastropod mollusk in the family Mangeliidae.

The taxonomy is this species is uncertain. Relying on Tucker, the website |Gastropods.com  states this species as Oenopota harpularius (Couthouy, J.P., 1838), while WoRMS states Oenopota harpularius as a synonym of Propebela harpularia (Couthouy, 1838)

Description
The characters of this species are very variable. Usually, the ribs are 14–16 in number, but some specimens have as many as 20. The colour is always red, or brownish. The interspaces between the ribs, round the angulated part of the body whorl, are concavely excavated. There transverse sculpture appears without being interrupted by the carina.

Distribution
This species occurs in arctic and boreal seas.

References

 
 Couthouy, Boston Journ. Nat. Hist. 1838, Pag. 106, Pl. 1, Fig. 10.
 Brunel, P.; Bosse, L.; Lamarche, G. (1998). Catalogue of the marine invertebrates of the estuary and Gulf of St. Lawrence. Canadian Special Publication of Fisheries and Aquatic Sciences, 126. 405 p.
 Bogdanov, I. P. Mollusks of Oenopotinae subfamily (Gastropoda, Pectinibranchia, Turridae) in the seas of the USSR. Nauka, 1990.

External links
 
  Tucker, J.K. 2004 Catalog of recent and fossil turrids (Mollusca: Gastropoda). Zootaxa 682:1–1295.
 Nekhaev, Ivan O. "Marine shell-bearing Gastropoda of Murman (Barents Sea): an annotated check-list." Ruthenica 24.2 (2014): 75

harpularia
Gastropods described in 1838